Devojački Bunar is a small settlement in Serbia. It is situated in the Alibunar municipality, South Banat District, Vojvodina province. Officially, Devojački Bunar is not classified as a separate settlement, but as part of the town of Banatski Karlovac, therefore is not included in the census measurements.

External links
JP Turist Alibunar - official site

Populated places in Serbian Banat